Morocco competed at the 2018 Mediterranean Games in Tarragona, Spain from 22 June to 1 July 2018.

Medals

Karate 

Abdessalam Ameknassi won the gold medal in the men's kumite 60 kg event. Aicha Sayah won the silver medal in the women's kumite 50 kg event.

References 

Nations at the 2018 Mediterranean Games
2018
2018 in Moroccan sport